China Media Capital (Chinese: 华人文化) is private equity firm specializing in growth capital, mid venture, late venture, emerging growth, corporate restructuring, management buyouts, and mergers & acquisitions. The firm prefers to invest in the cultural, technology, media, entertainment, consumer, medical treatment, and telecommunication sectors. It invests both inside and outside China.

China Media Capital was founded in 2009 and is based in Shanghai, China, with an additional office in Beijing. CMC has shares in the City Football Group and Formula E team Techeetah.

Filmography (abridged) 
 The Wandering Earth (2019)
 Pegasus (2019)

See also 
 China Film Group Corporation
 Flagship Entertainment Group (41%)
 Pearl Studio
 Star China Media
 China Movie Channel
 Alpha Group Co., Ltd. (99%)

References 

Chinese companies established in 2009
Financial services companies of China
Financial services companies established in 2009